Cheremoshki is a rural locality in Vyshnederevensky Selsoviet Rural Settlement, Lgovsky District, Kursk Oblast, Russia. Population:

Geography 
The village is located on the Byk River (a left tributary of the Seym), 33 km from the Russia–Ukraine border, 68 km south-west of Kursk, 15 km south-east of the district center – the town Lgov, 5 km from the selsoviet center – Vyshniye Derevenki.

 Climate
Cheremoshki has a warm-summer humid continental climate (Dfb in the Köppen climate classification).

Transport 
Cheremoshki is located on the road of regional importance  (Lgov – Sudzha), on the road of intermunicipal significance  (38K-024 – Cheremoshki – Vyshniye Derevenki), 5 km from the nearest (closed) railway halt Derevenki (railway line Lgov I — Podkosylev).

The rural locality is situated 75 km from Kursk Vostochny Airport, 132 km from Belgorod International Airport and 276 km from Voronezh Peter the Great Airport.

References

Notes

Sources

Rural localities in Lgovsky District